The Česká společnost pro vědeckou a technickou komunikaci (ČSVTK), in English Czech Society for  Scientific and Technical Communication, is the Czech association for technical communication. Its aims are to popularize and advance the theory and practice of technical communication in the Czech Republic.

Overview
CSVTK is, according to its website, the national organization for scientific and technical communication in the Czech Republic. It is active mainly in Prague and has also members in Hradec Králové and Brno. Special interest groups and a committee for establishing standards and guidelines are at the moment established. CSVTK members are, to a large extent, foreigners and both Czech and English are used in their communications. They work in a variety of roles, including:

Technical writing
Editing
Content development (web)
Single source publishing
Education 
Technical illustration
Instructional design
Usability 
Consulting
Management

CSVTK publishes a bimonthly newsletter and prepares several publications.

The CSVTK offers three types of individual membership. The full membership is available for people citing a professional interest in technical communication. Students with an interest are entitled to student membership. Members. The fellowship is reserved for members who have contributed to the profession in an exceptional manner. Organizations can join the CSVTK as Business Affiliates.

History
The organization started out as a loosely organized discussion group of technical writers on LinkedIn. Shortly after, the first workshops and seminars were organized. In 2009, CSVTK got registered as a non-profit organization and held its first general assembly.

Notes

See also

 Technical communication
 Technical writer
 Technical writing
 TCeurope (European Umbrella Organisation for technical communication)
 European Association for Technical Communication (Largest European professional society for technical communication)
 Society for Technical Communication (US-based)
 Institute of Scientific and Technical Communicators (UK-based)
 Wikiversity Technical Writing course a very good introduction to technical writing

External links

Technical communication
Professional associations based in the Czech Republic